Veneziano is an Italian surname or given name derived from Venice, Italy, and may refer to:

People
Agostino Veneziano (c.1490-c.1540), nickname of prolific Italian engraver Agostino de' Musi
Antonio Veneziano (1543-1593), Italian poet from Sicily, considered among the greatest poets who also wrote in Sicilian
Antonio Veneziano, Italian painter
Battista Franco Veneziano (before 1510-1561), Italian Mannerist painter and printmaker in etching
Corrado Veneziano (born 1958), Italian painter, visual artist, television and theater director
Domenico Veneziano (c.1410-1461), Italian painter of the early Renaissance, active mostly in Perugia and Tuscany
Donato Veneziano, 15th-century Italian painter
Gabriele Veneziano (born 1942), Italian theoretical physicist and one of the "fathers of string theory"; discovered Veneziano amplitude
Giuseppe Veneziano (born 1971), Italian painter
Hassan Veneziano, Venetian slave and Algiers regent 
Jacometto Veneziano (1460s-1497), Italian painter and illuminator 
Lorenzo Veneziano, 14th-century Italian painter
Paolo Veneziano (died after 1358), Italian medieval painter from Venice (also often referenced as Veneziano Paolo)
Stefano Veneziano, 14th-century Italian painter

Fictional
Angelina Veneziano, character on The Young and the Restless.
Italy Veneziano, character from Hetalia: Axis Powers

See also
Spritz Veneziano, an Italian wine-based cocktail 
Rondò Veneziano, an Italian chamber orchestra

Italian-language surnames
Sephardic surnames
Surnames of Italian origin
Italian toponymic surnames